Joon Wolfsberg (born March 8, 1992) is a German singer-songwriter, best known as the lead vocalist, songwriter, and name giver of the band "Joon Wolfsberg“

Live
She was introduced to music at the age of 6, taking piano, drums and singing lessons at the public music school Erfurt in Germany. At the age of 15 she taught herself how to play the guitar. After high school in 2010 she completely dedicated herself to music. At this time she already performed her own songs on the street as a street musician.

Career
In 2007 with the age of 15 she began to write her own songs. 
In 2008 Joon Wolfsberg composed a song for a project from the singer Will.I.Am of the Black Eyed Peas, at this time she still worked under the artist name „Joon W.“  Since 2010 she writes all her songs together with her dad Joe Wolfsberg (who also is the producer of all the records she made)

In January 2011 she recorded her debut album „Made In USA“ in the „Tracking Room Studios“ in Nashville together with Dave Roe (last bass player of Johnny Cash), Buddy Hyatt (piano player at Toto), Shawn Fichter (drummer of Peter Frampton), Smith Curry (guitar player of Kid Rock) and Bobby Terry (Guitar Player for Amy Grant).

The record „Made In USA“ was released on April 1, 2011 as digital version and on May 14, 2011 as physical copy. 
The single „Please“ received hot rotation airplay on Radio Swiss Pop and became very well known among the Swiss. It still gets airplay constantly.

The „Made in USA“ album got a lot attention and was also shared in the music scene of Los Angeles. In this way the connection to the band members of Blind Melon, Brad Smith (Bass) and Christopher Thorn (guitar) and  Dave Krusen (first drummer of Pearl Jam) took place.
With them she recorded her second album „Wonderland“ again in the „Tracking Room Stuios“ Nashville /TN in 2012.

The Financial Times Germany elected the Wonderland Album to be the album of the week on June 3, 2012 and gave it 5 out of 5 points.

In the end of 2012 Joon Wolfsberg founded her first band in Germany. 
In 2013 she recorded the third album „Revolujoon“ and in 2014 the fourth album „The Deluxe Underdog“ together with her new band members Toni Funk (guitar) and Michael Nowatzky (drums) in a german recording studio.

Rolling Stone elected the album „The Deluxe Underdog“ to be on place 9 out of the 52 worst albums of 2014.

International Critics

Discography

 Green Boots (Demo Album) (2010)
 Made in USA (2011)
 Wonderland (2012)
 Revolujoon (2013)
 The Deluxe Underdog (2014)
 1220 Wells Street (2017)

See also
 List of alternative rock artists

References

External links

 
 Joon Wolfsberg at Musicbrainz 

 

1992 births
Living people